Raymond J. St. Leger (born 1957, in London, England) is an American mycologist, entomologist, molecular biologist and biotechnologist who currently holds the rank of Distinguished University Professor in the Department of Entomology (https://entomology.umd.edu/) at the University of Maryland, College Park.

Research and career

St. Leger went to the United States to begin his career at the Boyce Thompson Institute at the invitation of Donald W. Roberts. According to Google Scholar, he has since then published more than 150 scientific papers and book chapters on fungal pathogens of plants, animals and insects, and on the reactions of hosts to infection. St. Leger has principally used entomopathogenic fungus (fungi that act as parasites of insects), as models for understanding how pathogens in general respond to stress, changing environments, initiate host invasion, colonize tissues, and counter host immune responses. These investigations have also addressed the mechanisms by which new pathogens emerge with different host ranges  and genetic variation between individuals in host defenses. Other interests include fungal and insect behavior and evolution, molecular biology and genomics of fungi, and mutualistic associations between microbes and plants that can be exploited to benefit agriculture.

St. Leger is also known for developing transgenic technologies, including altering insect pathogens so that they carry genes encoding spider and scorpion toxins. A field trial in Burkina Faso has shown that these engineered pathogens have the potential to control insect borne diseases such as malaria. St. Leger has tested an array of "alternative engineering strategies to be consistent with the highly exploratory approach required for optimizing a pathogens biocontrol potential". For example, engineering a mosquito pathogenic fungus to carry a gene for a human anti-malarial antibody so that the fungus targets the malarial parasite in the mosquito reduces the possibility of mosquitoes evolving resistance to the fungus.

St. Leger has been a consultant on biotechnology to many private and public concerns, including the NIH, the USDA, the NSF, the US State Department and the Organization of American States. St. Leger has also served on many national and international policy-making committees including the Bill Gates funded National Academies Committee to study technologies to benefit Sub Saharan Africa and South Asia (2009).

St. Leger is an advocate of online open education and since 2013 has co-taught with Dr. Tammatha O’Brien (https://tammatha.weebly.com/) a MOOC on the Coursera platform called Genes and the Human Condition   that has had more than 200,000 active learners.

Education
St. Leger received his Bachelor of Science in biology from Exeter University, England in 1978, a Master of Science in entomology in 1980 from Birkbeck College, London University, and a Doctor of Philosophy in 1985 from the University of Bath, England.

Awards and honors 
St. Leger has received several awards for his research, he was elected a fellow of the AAAS (2012), the American Academy of Microbiology (2013),  the Royal Entomological Society of London (FRES) (2011), the Entomological Society of America (2019) and is a Fellow of the Royal Society of Biology (FRSB). He received the American Society for Microbiology Promega Biotechnology Research Award (2017) and was the inaugural recipient of the Tai Fung-Lan Award for International Cooperation from The Mycological Society of China (2016). St. Leger received an honorary doctorate from his alma mater of Exeter University in 2018  and the Newcomb Cleveland Prize for the most impactful paper published in the journal Science in 2019. St. Leger gave the Founders lecture at the 2009 Society of Invertebrate Pathology Meeting honoring his friend and frequent collaborator Donald W. Roberts.

Selected bibliography

References

External links
The St. Leger Lab

1957 births
Living people
21st-century American biologists
British emigrants to the United States
Alumni of the University of Exeter
Alumni of the University of Bath
Scientists from London
University of Maryland, College Park faculty
American mycologists
American entomologists
Raymond